Capricorn is one of the 5 districts of Limpopo province of South Africa. The district is named after the Tropic of Capricorn which runs through it. The capital of Capricorn is Polokwane. The vast majority of its 1,261,463 people speak Northern Sotho as their home language (2011 census). The district code is DC35.

Geography

Neighbours 
Capricorn is surrounded by:
 Vhembe (DC34) to the north-east
 Mopani (DC33) east
 Sekhukhune (CBDC3) to the south 
 Waterberg (DC36) to the west

Local municipalities 
The district contains the following local municipalities:

Demographics
The following statistics are from the 2011 census.

Gender

Ethnic group

Age

Politics

Election results 
Election results for Capricorn in the South African general election, 2004. 
 Population 18 and over: 601 852 [52.12% of total population] 
 Total votes: 341 004 [29.53% of total population] 
 Voting % estimate: 56.66% votes as a % of population 18 and over

See also
 Municipal Demarcation Board

References

External links
 Capricorn DM Official Website 

District municipalities of Limpopo
Capricorn District Municipality